200 Cigarettes is a 1999 American comedy film directed by Risa Bramon Garcia and written by Shana Larsen. The film follows multiple characters in New York City on New Year's Eve 1981. The film features an ensemble cast consisting of brothers Ben and Casey Affleck, Dave Chappelle, Guillermo Díaz, Angela Featherstone, Janeane Garofalo, Gaby Hoffmann, Kate Hudson, Courtney Love, Jay Mohr, Nicole Ari Parker, Martha Plimpton, Christina Ricci and Paul Rudd, with a cameo by Elvis Costello, as well as paintings by Sally Davies.

Plot
The film follows various plot arcs all occurring on New Year's Eve of 1981. Monica is throwing a big party and is desperately afraid no one will attend. Early on, the only arrival is her friend Hillary.  As Monica tries to convince Hillary to stay, various other groupings are shown making their way to the celebration.

The plot follows these several characters as they spend New Year's Eve in New York City before eventually turning up at Monica's party. The party guests are:
 Monica's cousin Val and her friend Stephie, who are from Ronkonkoma and who get lost in the seedy Alphabet City section of the borough and wander into a punk club where they meet Dave and Tom, who have a "package" they need to deliver.
 Ditsy and awkward Cindy, who is on a dinner date with the paranoid Jack.
 Lucy and her best friend Kevin, who are struggling with their mutual sexual tension. The film's title stems from the carton of cigarettes Lucy buys Kevin that night, a present on a holiday he loathes, which is also his birthday.
 Kevin's feminist ex-girlfriend Ellie, who walks in on Kevin and Lucy making out in a restroom stall
 A dim-witted and flirtatious bartender.
 Competitive friends Bridget and Caitlyn who attempt to ditch Bridget's boyfriend Eric, who is also Monica's ex.
 And an eccentric cab driver who takes them all around town throughout the evening in his disco-themed taxi.

Eventually, everyone finds their way to the party, although Monica has passed out after drowning her sorrows in alcohol. She wakes the next morning to find unrecognizable people on her floor, including Stephie, who tells her what a big hit her party was. Monica is thrilled, even though she missed it all, especially when she finds out that Elvis Costello showed up.

The final montage shows Polaroids of the party, narrated by the disco cabbie, mostly featuring the unlikely romances from the night and the unconscious Monica being propped up by her guests.

Cast
 Ben Affleck as Bartender
 Casey Affleck as Tom
 Caleb Carr as Cynical Bar Patron
 Dave Chappelle as Disco Cabbie
 Elvis Costello as himself
 Guillermo Díaz as Dave
 Angela Featherstone as Caitlyn
 Janeane Garofalo as Ellie
 Gaby Hoffmann as Stephie
 Kate Hudson as Cindy
 Catherine Kellner as Hillary
 Courtney Love as Lucy
 Brian McCardie as Eric
 Jay Mohr as Jack
 Nicole Ari Parker as Bridget
 Martha Plimpton as Monica
 Christina Ricci as Val
 Paul Rudd as Kevin

Release
The film received generally negative reviews and grossed $6.8 million in the United States.

On Rotten Tomatoes the film has an approval rating of 30% based on 63 reviews, with an average rating of 4.4/10 and the consensus that it is "[a] clumsy and scattered comedy with a poorly executed script". On Metacritic the film has a score of 33% based on reviews from 26 critics, indicating "Generally unfavorable reviews."

Todd McCarthy of Variety magazine called the film "dismally unfunny" and questions "if any director could have surmounted the script’s limitations" and of the acting performances he says "only Garofalo and Ben Affleck manage to project any wit that cracks through the prevailing humorlessness."

Mick LaSalle of the San Francisco Chronicle gave it a positive review, saying "200 Cigarettes doesn't have a bad scene or a false note. The picture is a succession of pointed little moments, nicely written by Shana Larsen and acted with comic assurance and sensitivity."

References

External links

 
 
 
 

1999 films
1999 comedy-drama films
1990s English-language films
Films scored by Mark Mothersbaugh
Films about parties
Films about smoking
Films set in 1981
Films set in Manhattan
Lakeshore Entertainment films
MTV Films films
Films set around New Year
Paramount Pictures films
American comedy-drama films
1999 directorial debut films
1990s American films